Jimmy Lee Fautheree (April 11, 1934 - June 29, 2004) was an American rockabilly and country singer.

Born in Smackover, Arkansas, he began playing guitar at age 12, and was heavily influenced by Merle Travis. In 1946 his family moved to Dallas, where he played on KRLD's Big D Jamboree. By 1951 he was playing on the Louisiana Hayride; that year he signed to Capitol Records and released his first single, "I Keep the Blues All the Time", as Jimmy Lee. Capitol released seven further singles from Fautheree before dropping him in 1952. Despite never charting, the recordings have been cited as influential on later rockabilly artists, including James Burton.

Fautheree subsequently found work as a session musician for musicians such as Faron Young and Webb Pierce. Along with "Country" Johnny Mathis, he performed on Louisiana Hayride as Jimmy & Johnny, and released a charting single under the "Jimmy Lee & Johnny Mathis" moniker on Chess Records, 1954's "If You Don't, Somebody Else Will". Fautheree left Mathis to work with Wayne Walker, a partnership that lasted only four months but yielded a few recordings. Following this he began recording with his brother Lynn, again under the name Jimmy & Johnny; they signed to Decca Records, but by 1957 the pair had moved back to Dallas.

Fautheree went back to solo recording, recording in New Orleans in 1958 at J&M Studio. He recorded briefly with Mathis again between 1958 and 1959. Some self-released material and a single on Paula Records brought him into 1960, and throughout the next decade Fautheree worked increasingly in the genre of gospel music.

By the 1970s Fautheree had left the business, working in asbestos removal. In 1995, he returned to music with Mathis, recording a new single, "It Won't Be Much Longer", together. He played both in the U.S. and abroad in the 2000s, and released a full-length album with Deke Dickerson entitled I Found the Doorknob. Shortly after the album was complete he died of cancer in Dallas on June 29, 2004.

His mother's name was Lodema Hammonds, the daughter of Mack Hammonds of Maud, Texas, who was a descendant of Phillip Hamman, the Savior of the Greenbrier.

Discography

References
[ Jimmy Lee Fautheree] at Allmusic

1934 births
2004 deaths
American country singer-songwriters
American rockabilly musicians
Singer-songwriters from Arkansas
American session musicians
People from Smackover, Arkansas
20th-century American singers
Country musicians from Arkansas